The 3 Track Demo or the "First Demo" by Rolo Tomassi is a handmade demo CD-R recorded and released at the beginning of 2005 and was the first release on the band's own label; "Mayday". The entire CD-R was recorded inside Edward Dutton's shed.

The CD-R was very limited and eventually sold out completely. After the original demo CD-Rs had sold out, the band handmade another two variations of the CD-R, each with completely new artwork and packaging.

Only 50 copies of the original CD-R were pressed, each with different coloured cover art and each at very limited availability. 10 pink covers were made, 10 green covers, 15 blue covers and 15 red covers.

The second pressing of the demo is a 3" CD-R inside a plastic wallet. Only 50 copies of these were made.

The third and final pressing of the demo is often named the "Angel Demo"; a plain white CD-R with the band's name written on to in blue ink. The CD-R is packaged inside a brown-paper wallet, stapled at each side to hold the CD. Inside the packaging are some small pieces of paper including a monochrome picture of the band performing live, the track listing to the CD and finally information on the band members and origin of the CD itself. These, also, were limited to only 50 copies.

Track listing

References

Rolo Tomassi albums
2005 debut EPs